Joffrey Verbruggen (born 7 February 1989 in Brussels) is a Belgian actor. His acting credits include Unspoken (2008), The Boat Race (2009), Superstar (2012), Dead Man Talking (2012). He received the Magritte Award for Most Promising Actor for his work in The Boat Race.

References

External links

1989 births
Living people
Belgian male actors
Magritte Award winners